Bugs in Amber is the second album by the Bristol based jazz rock quartet Get the Blessing, released in 2009 (see 2008 in music).

The tracks are all instrumental, although other versions of "The Unnameable" and "Bugs in Amber" (re-titled "Moot") have been performed with vocals live, and recorded in session for the BBC 6Music Freakzone programme.

The album was favourably received by the British broadsheets. The Sunday Times stated that "Get the Blessing care little for the rule book: “wonky rock-jazz” is how the Bristol quartet sum up the sax and trumpet interplay. There’s a cool intelligence at work... Deamer lays down the firmest of beats without drowning his colleagues in the backwash. One of the quirkiest British releases of the year". The Guardian noted that "this follow-up... cuts the excellent Judge and McMurchie a lot more solo slack, while sustaining the strength of the composing, the deafening dancefloor drive and the ensemble inventiveness", and summed up with "This is a really varied and inventive genre-crossing set". The Independent felt the band "sound even more live and dangerous on this follow-up" and "like Big Air, the horns now take their thrashy/delicate influences from the Balkans as much as free jazz".

Track listing
"Music Style Product" – 3:56
"The Word For Moonlight Is Moonlight" – 4:22
"The Unnameable" – 6:33
"Bugs in Amber" – 4:41
"Tarp" – 7:00
"Einstein Action Figure" – 4:09 
"The Speed Of Dark" – 5:23
"So It Goes" – 3:08
"Yes I Said Yes I Will Yes" – 2:09
"Trapdoor" – 1:21

Personnel
Jake McMurchie – saxophone, treated piano, vibraphone, effects, bells
Pete Judge – trumpet, flugelhorn, celeste, effects, bells
Jim Barr – bass guitar, baritone guitar, effects, bells
Clive Deamer – drums, maracas, bells

Guests
Adrian Utley – electric guitar
Tammy Payne – backing vocals ("Music Style Product")
Beth Porter – cello ("The Unnameable")
Jeff Spencer – viola ("Music Style Product")

Technical
Produced by Jim Barr and Get the Blessing
Engineered by Jim Barr and Rik Dowding
Mixed by Jim Barr and Get the Blessing
Mastered by Shawn Joseph, Optimum Studios

Release history
22 April 2009: Cake Music (Candid Records, CACD78558)

References

2009 albums
Get the Blessing albums